‼ (a double exclamation mark, Unicode character U+203C) may refer to:

 !! (chess), a brilliant move chess notation
 Double factorial, an operator in mathematics
 Retroflex click, a family of click consonants found only in Juu languages and in the Damin ritual jargon
 Double-negation translation, !!p = p.

See also 
 ! (disambiguation)
 !!! (disambiguation)